or National Suruga Sanatorium is a national sanatorium for leprosy and ex-leprosy patients situated in Gotemba, Shizuoka, Japan since 1945.

History
After the start of the Second Sino-Japanese War (July 7, 1937- ),  wounded soldiers became problematic and Matsuki Miyazaki proposed in 1937 that those who developed leprosy, during military service, should be given treatment and pension in the same degree as those who developed tuberculosis during service.

The following is a timeline of events:
1940: Treatment for leprosy in Japanese soldiers was approved.
1942: A sanatorium was planned and National Sanatorium Wounded Soldiers' Suruga Sanatorium was established on December 15, 1944.
December 15, 1944: Sanatorium opened.
June 10, 1945: The first patient was hospitalized.  
December 1, 1945: The facility became National Suruga Sanatorium. 
April 1996: The 1953 Leprosy Prevention Law was abolished.
July 1998: The trial for compensation started.
May 11, 2001: The trial for compensation ruled that the previous Leprosy Prevention was unconstitutional.
May 25, 2001: The trial for compensation was confirmed. The compensation of 8,000,000 yen to 14,000,000 yen was given to patients depending on the duration of their incarceration.

Patients
The number of in-patients varied depending on admissions, deaths, escapes and discharges.

Space
The site covered . The buildings covered

See also
 Leprosy in Japan

References

External links
 Official website 

Hospital buildings completed in 1945
Hospitals in Japan
Leper hospitals
Hospitals established in 1944
Leprosy in Japan